"Anything You Can Do (I Can Do Better)" is a show tune composed by Irving Berlin for the 1946 Broadway musical Annie Get Your Gun. The song is a duet, with one male singer and one female singer attempting to outdo each other in increasingly complex tasks.

In the musical, the song sets the scene for the climactic sharpshooting contest between Annie Oakley and Frank Butler. Its most memorable lines are, "Anything you can do, I can do better; I can do anything better than you." The song was first performed in Annie Get Your Gun by Ethel Merman and Ray Middleton.

During the song, they argue playfully about who can, for example, sing softer, sing higher, sing sweeter, and hold a note for longer, and boast of their abilities and accomplishments, such as opening safes and living on bread and cheese, although Annie almost always seems to counter Frank's argument. Neither can "bake a pie," though.

Notable versions
 Ethel Merman and Ray Middleton from original cast recording (1946).
 Bing Crosby, Dick Haymes and The Andrews Sisters—recorded for Decca Records on March 19, 1947. 
 Groucho Marx and his daughter Melinda Marx (a child at the time) in home movie footage used for select TV specials.
 Ethel Merman and Howard Keel (1950)
 Betty Hutton and Howard Keel in the 1950 film version of the musical
 Mary Martin and John Raitt on the 1957 National Tour recording
 Doris Day and Robert Goulet for the Columbia Records album Annie Get Your Gun (1963) 
 In 1963, Heidi Brühl and Robert Trehy performed a German version in the stage version of this musical at the Theater des Westens in Berlin.
 Ethel Merman and Bruce Yarnell in the 1966 revival recording.
 Dusty Springfield and Freddie Paris on Bandstand (1967).
 Robert Morse and an office computer in 1968 TV series That's Life, episode S1E11 "Bobby's Pink Slip"
 Two dogs in The Goodies episode "Kitten Kong" (1971).
 Barbara Walters and Howard Cosell on Saturday Night Live with Howard Cosell in 1975 debating who interviews people better.
 Ethel Merman and Miss Piggy (1976) in The Muppet Show, episode 1.22
 In 1977, Tina Arena and John Bowles recorded a version for their album Tiny Tina and Little John. 
 In 1990, Kidsongs released Ride the Roller Coaster, which contained a version of this song, where they play various arcade games at the Six Flags Magic Mountain amusement park.
 Fran Drescher and Madeline Zima (1994) in The Nanny, episode S1E22 "I Don't Remember Mama"
 Michael Jordan and Mia Hamm, Gatorade "Michael vs. Mia" commercial (1999), performed by Sophia Ramos
 Bernadette Peters and Tom Wopat in the 1999 Broadway revival version of the musical
 Lewis Hamilton and Fernando Alonso in a 2007 Mercedes-Benz commercial with Mika Häkkinen performing the last line.
 Blaire Elbert and Madeline Powell Cactus Cuties, performed at Cactus Theater in Texas in 2008.
 American rapper J. Cole used the "Anything you can do" line in his 2010 single "Who Dat".
 Lindsay Pearce sang a mashup of "Anything Goes"/"Anything You Can Do" in the Glee 2011 third-season premiere, "The Purple Piano Project".
 Dirty Rice sampled the opening lines of the song in the 116 Clique song "Envy", from the 2011 album Man Up by the 116 Clique.
Laura Osnes and Jeremy Jordan live at Cafe Carlyle in 2012
 Internet comedy personalities Smosh performed a parody of the song in 2014 titled "Anything You Can Do, I Can Do Dumber", as a tie-in to promote the film Dumb and Dumber To.
 Julianne Hough and Derek Hough on their Move Live on Tour in 2014.
 Dame Shirley Bassey performed this song with the group Blake on the 2016 TV Special titled David Walliams Celebrates Dame Shirley Bassey.
 Barbra Streisand and Melissa McCarthy perform the duet as part of Streisand's 2016 album Encore: Movie Partners Sing Broadway, with altered lyrics.
 AP-5 and Chopper on the Star Wars Rebels 2017 episode "Double Agent Droid," argue about their capabilities using lines from the song.
 Darci Lynne and Terry Fator with their two puppets, Petunia and Winston on the finale of season 12 of America's Got Talent.
 Abby Wambach and Usain Bolt in a 2021 Gatorade commercial, also featuring Michael Jordan and Mia Hamm at the end in a reference to a 1999 commercial featuring Jordan and Hamm.

Other recorded versions
 Ethel Merman and Neilson Taylor (1973)
 Judy Garland and Howard Keel (Pre-Production of film Annie Get Your Gun)
 The Majors
 Von Trapp Children (song is on their Live in Concert DVD)
Jim McNaught (1964)

Variants
 Peter Tosh: "I'm the Toughest"
 Neil Patrick Harris and Hugh Jackman: Live performance, 2011 Tony Awards

References

Songs from Annie Get Your Gun
Songs written by Irving Berlin
1946 songs
Doris Day songs
Male–female vocal duets
The Muppets songs
Songs with feminist themes